In medieval history, West Francia or the Kingdom of the West Franks refers to the western part of the Frankish Empire established by Charlemagne. It was the forerunner of the future Kingdom of France and existed from 843 to 987. West Francia emerged from the partition of the Carolingian Empire in 843 under the Treaty of Verdun following the death of Charlemagne's son, Louis the Pious. It is considered the first separate polity in French history.

West Francia extended further north and south than modern metropolitan France, but it did not extend as far east. It did not include such future French holdings as Lorraine, the County and Kingdom of Burgundy (the duchy was already a part of West Francia), Alsace and Provence in the east and southeast for example. It also did not include the Brittany peninsula in the west. In addition, by the 10th century the authority of the West Frankish monarchs was greatly reduced. This was contrasted by the evergrowing power of their vassals over their large and usually territorially contiguous fiefs. 

The power vacuum left by a weak royal authority meant wars between fiefs were rampant, and so were conflicts between the vassals and the Frankish monarchs themselves. The period was also marked by endless Viking raids on the kingdom and clashes between the West Franks and the Norsemen. This eventually led to the establishment of the Duchy of Normandy, which was granted to the Norseman Rollo and his men following their unsuccessful siege at Chartres in 911 in exchange for an oath of fealty to King Charles the Simple. The fiefdom of Normandy was first a county then a duchy, and like other great fiefs of West Francia became largely autonomous, with magnates even more powerful than their monarch. 

In Brittany and Catalonia the authority of the West Frankish king was barely felt. West Frankish kings were elected by the secular and ecclesiastic magnates, and for the half-century between 888 and 936 candidates from the Carolingian and Robertian houses were alternately chosen as monarchs. By this time the power of king became weaker and more nominal, as the regional dukes and nobles became more powerful in their semi-independent regions. The Robertians, after becoming counts of Paris and dukes of France, became kings themselves and established the Capetian dynasty after 987, which is, although arbitrary, generally defined as the gradual transition towards the Kingdom of France.

Formation and borders

In August 843, after three years of civil war following the death of Louis the Pious on 20 June 840, the Treaty of Verdun was signed by his three sons and heirs. The youngest, Charles the Bald, received western Francia. The contemporary West Frankish Annales Bertiniani describes Charles arriving at Verdun, "where the distribution of portions" took place. After describing the portions of his brothers, Lothair the Emperor (Middle Francia) and Louis the German (East Francia), he notes that "the rest as far as Spain they ceded to Charles". The Annales Fuldenses of East Francia describe Charles as holding the western part after the kingdom was "divided in three".

Since the death of King Pippin I of Aquitaine in December 838, his son had been recognised by the Aquitainian nobility as King Pippin II of Aquitaine, although the succession had not been recognised by the emperor. Charles the Bald was at war with Pippin II from the start of his reign in 840, and the Treaty of Verdun ignored the claimant and assigned Aquitaine to Charles. Accordingly, in June 845, after several military defeats, Charles signed the Treaty of Benoît-sur-Loire and recognised his nephew's rule. This agreement lasted until 25 March 848, when the Aquitainian barons recognised Charles as their king. Thereafter Charles's armies had the upper hand, and by 849 had secured most of Aquitaine. In May, Charles had himself crowned "King of the Franks and Aquitainians" in Orléans. Archbishop Wenilo of Sens officiated at the coronation, which included the first instance of royal unction in West Francia. The idea of anointing Charles may be owed to Archbishop Hincmar of Reims, who composed no less than four ordines describing appropriate liturgies for a royal consecration. By the time of the Synod of Quierzy (858), Hincmar was claiming that Charles was anointed to the entire West Frankish kingdom. With the Treaty of Mersen in 870 the western part of Lotharingia was added to West Francia. In 875 Charles the Bald was crowned Emperor of Rome.

The last record in the Annales Bertiniani dates to 882, and so the only contemporary narrative source for the next eighteen years in West Francia is the Annales Vedastini. The next set of original annals from the West Frankish kingdom are those of Flodoard, who began his account with the year 919.

Reign of Charles the Fat
After the death of Charles's grandson, Carloman II, on 12 December 884, the West Frankish nobles elected his uncle, Charles the Fat, already king in East Francia and Kingdom of Italy, as their king. He was probably crowned "King in Gaul" (rex in Gallia) on 20 May 885 at Grand. His reign was the only time after the death of Louis the Pious that all of Francia would be re-united under one ruler. In his capacity as king of West Francia, he seems to have granted the royal title and perhaps regalia to the semi-independent ruler of Brittany, Alan I. His handling of the Viking siege of Paris in 885–86 greatly reduced his prestige. In November 887 his nephew, Arnulf of Carinthia revolted and assumed the title as King of the East Franks. Charles retired and soon died on 13 January 888.

In Aquitaine, Duke Ranulf II may have had himself recognised as king, but he only lived another two years. Although Aquitaine did not become a separate kingdom, it was largely outside the control of the West Frankish kings.

Odo, Count of Paris was then elected by nobles as the new king of West Francia, and was crowned the next month. At this point, West Francia was composed of Neustria in the west and in the east by Francia proper, the region between the Meuse and the Seine.

Rise of Robertians

After the 860s, Lotharingian noble Robert the Strong became increasingly powerful as count of Anjou, Touraine and Maine. Robert's brother Hugh, abbot of Saint-Denis, was given control over Austrasia by Charles the Bald. Robert's son Odo was elected king in 888. Odo's brother Robert I ruled between 922 and 923 and was followed by Rudolph from 923 until 936. Hugh the Great, son of Robert I, was elevated to the title "duke of the Franks" by king Louis IV. In 987 his son Hugh Capet was elected king and the Capetian dynasty began. At this point they controlled very little beyond the Île-de-France.

Rise of dukes

Outside the old Frankish territories and in the south local nobles were semi-independent after 887 as duchies were created: Burgundy, Aquitaine, Brittany, Gascony, Normandy, Champagne and the County of Flanders.

The power of the kings continued to decline, together with their inability to resist the Vikings and to oppose the rise of regional nobles who were no longer appointed by the king but became hereditary local dukes. In 877 Boso of Provence, brother-in-law of Charles the Bald, crowned himself as the king of Burgundy and Provence. His son Louis the Blind was king of Provence from 890 and Emperor between 901 and 905. Rudolph II of Burgundy established the Kingdom of Burgundy in 933.

Charles the Simple
After the death of East Francia's last Carolingian king Louis the Child, Lotharingia switched allegiance to the king of West Francia, Charles the Simple. After 911 the Duchy of Swabia extended westwards and added lands of Alsace. Baldwin II of Flanders became increasingly powerful after the Odo's death in 898, gaining Boulogne and Ternois from Charles. The territory over which the king exercised actual control shrank considerably, and was reduced to lands between Normandy and river Loire. The royal court usually stayed in Rheims or Laon.

Norsemen began settling in Normandy, and from 919 Magyars invaded repeatedly. In the absence of strong royal power, invaders were engaged and defeated by local nobles, like Richard of Burgundy and Robert of Neustria, who defeated Viking leader Rollo in 911 at Chartres. The Norman threat was eventually ended, with the last Danegeld paid in 924 and 926. Both nobles became increasingly opposed to Charles, and in 922 deposed him and elected Robert I as the new king. After Robert's death in 923 nobles elected Rudolf as king, and kept Charles imprisoned until his death in 929. After the rule of king Charles the Simple, local dukes began issuing their own currency.

Rudolf
King Rudolf was supported by his brother Hugh the Black and son of Robert I, Hugh the Great. Dukes of Normandy refused to recognise Rudolf until 933. The King also had to move with his army against the southern nobles to receive their homage and loyalty, however, the count of Barcelona managed to avoid this completely.

After 925 Rudolf was involved in a war against the rebellious Herbert II, Count of Vermandois, who received support from kings Henry the Fowler and Otto I of East Francia. His rebellion continued until his death in 943.

Louis IV
King Louis IV and Duke Hugh the Great were married to sisters of East Frankish king Otto I who after the deaths of their husbands managed Carolingian and Robertine rule together with their brother Bruno the Great, archbishop of Cologne, as regent.

After further victories by Herbert II, Louis was rescued only with the help of the large nobles and Otto I. In 942 Louis gave up Lotharingia to Otto I.

Succession conflict in Normandy led to a new war in which Louis was betrayed by Hugh the Great and captured by Danish prince Harald who eventually released him to the custody of Hugh, who freed the king only after receiving town of Laon as a compensation.

The last Carolingians: Lothair and Louis V
The 13-year old Lothair of France inherited all the lands of his father in 954. By this time they were so small that the Carolingian practice of dividing lands among the sons was not followed and his brother Charles received nothing. In 966 Lothair married Emma, stepdaughter of his maternal uncle Otto I. Despite this, in August 978 Lothair attacked the old imperial capital Aachen. Otto II retaliated by attacking Paris, but was defeated by the combined forces of king Lothar and nobles and peace was signed in 980, ending the brief Franco-German war.

Lothar managed to increase his power, but this was reversed with the coming of age of Hugh Capet, who began forming new alliances of nobles and eventually was elected as king in 987 after Lothair and his son and successor Louis V of France had both died prematurely, traditionally marking the end of the French branch of Carolingian dynasty as well as the end of West Francia as a kingdom. Hugh Capet would be the first ruler of a new royal house, the House of Capet, who would rule France through the High Middle Ages.

List of kings
Charles the Bald (843–877)
Louis the Stammerer (877–879)
Louis III of France (879–882)
Carloman II (882–884)
Charles the Fat (885–888)
Odo of France (888–898)
Charles the Simple (898–922)
Robert I of France (922–923)
Rudolph of France (923–936)
Louis IV of France (936–954)
Lothair of France (954–986)
Louis V of France (986–987)

Notes

References
Jim Bradbury. The Capetians: Kings of France, 987–1328. London: Hambledon Continuum, 2007.
Simon Coupland. "The Coinages of Pippin I and II of Aquitaine" Revue numismatique, 6th series, 31 (1989), 194–222.
Geoffrey Koziol. "Charles the Simple, Robert of Neustria, and the vexilla of Saint-Denis". Early Medieval Europe 14:4 (2006), 355–90.
Archibald R. Lewis. The Development of Southern French and Catalan Society, 718–1050. Austin: University of Texas Press, 1965.
Simon MacLean. Kingship and Politics in the Late Ninth Century: Charles the Fat and the end of the Carolingian Empire. Cambridge: Cambridge University Press, 2003.
Janet L. Nelson. "Kingship, Law and Liturgy in the Political Thought of Hincmar of Rheims". English Historical Review 92 (1977), 241–79. Reprinted in Politics and Ritual in Early Medieval Europe (London: Hambledon, 1986), 133–72.
Alfred Richard. Histoire des Comtes de Poitou, vol. 1 Paris: Alphonse Picard, 1903.
Julia M. H. Smith. Province and Empire: Brittany and the Carolingians. Cambridge: Cambridge University Press, 1992.

 
Former monarchies of Europe
843 establishments
987 disestablishments
States and territories established in the 840s
States and territories disestablished in the 980s
West Franks
Establishments in the Carolingian Empire
9th century in France
10th century in France
Former countries